Maddah (Persian: مداح), literally means eulogist or panegyrist; and it is attributed to religious singer. There is a kind of religious singer(s) in Islamic culture who are called Maddah that often participate in --anniversary-- funeral ceremonies of Muslims, particularly for the famous characters among the Islamic prophet Muhammad and twelve Imams of Shia; and they recite or sing in Islamic/sad manner for people (as a type of mourning).

The root of the word "Maddah" is "Madh" which means expressing the excellent traits of a character or a thing.

Maddah (or Dhakir) is an individual who mentions/praises the great characters and religious education in (religious) gatherings; and its performance ought to be mostly full of Eulogy/Marsiya; besides, Maddahi doesn't have special gender, age, group or elegy.

Idiomatically, Maddah means a dhakir or panegyrist who (often) stands beside the pulpit, and praises or turns into poetry about Ahlul-Bayt (and the Islamic prophet, Muhammad) and their tragedy, particularly regarding the disasters/tragedy of battle of Karbala, and Husayn ibn Ali's manner of martyrdom who was killed there with his companions by the enemies.

Notable maddahs
Saeed Haddadian
Mohammadreza Taheri
Mahmoud Karimi
Sadiq Ahangaran

See also 
 Mourning of Muharram
 Banu Hashim
 Maddahi
 Dhikr
 Dua

References 

Shia Islam
Islamic religious occupations